DecoPac, Inc. is a supplier and marketer of cake decorating products headquartered in Anoka, Minnesota. DecoPac supplies bakeries, professional cake decorators and cake decorating enthusiasts across the United States, Canada, and Europe. The company was formed in 1982 as an internal supplier of cake decorations for McGlynn's Bakery stores.

History 
DecoPac began as part of McGlynn Bakeries, which started as a single retail bakery in Minneapolis, Minnesota in 1919. The company expanded, increasing the number of retail bakeries and in-store supermarket bakeries. In 1965, McGlynn’s launched an innovative new approach to selling cakes by focusing on decorating cakes in view of consumers instead of the back room.

In the 1970s, McGlynn’s produced a book about decorated cakes, The Magic of Cakes. In 1982, DecoPac was formed as an internal unit supplying cake decorations to its own McGlynn’s Bakery stores.

Soon other bakeries learned of DecoPac through industry associations and DecoPac began marketing pre-packaged cake decorating kits, called DecoSets, to supermarkets, independent retail bakeries and bakery distributors. 
Since 1987, DecoPac has developed relationships and licensing agreements that give the company the right to market cake decorating products featuring popular characters and properties from Disney, Nickelodeon, Mattel, DreamWorks, Marvel Comics, LucasFilm, Warner Bros., Star Trek, Peanuts and professional sports such as from the NHL, NBA, NFL, and MLB.

DecoPac acquired Culpitt, Ltd., a supplier and wholesaler of sugar crafting edibles and equipment in the UK, in 1998. Culpitt manufactures cake boards, cake decorations, sugar fondant sheets, printed edible cake decorations and molded sugar cake decorations and sells to customers in the UK, Europe, Australia and New Zealand.

In 2002, DecoPac launched Cakes.com to connect consumers with bakeries to place cake orders online. Since that time, Cakes.com has evolved and in 2014 began selling DecoSets and other cake decorating products directly to consumers for use in decorating their own cakes.

In 2015 DecoPac purchased one of their largest competitors, Bakery Crafts. This strategic decision made them the world's largest supplier of cake decorations in the world.

On September 19, 2017 DecoPac, the once entirely family owned business, sold a large stake of the company to a private equity firm, Snow Phipps LLC.

Corporate Governance 
DecoPac, Inc. is a for-profit, private business which has a Board of Directors consisting of family owners, non-family management, and outside independent directors.

As of 2022, the company’s management included:
 Cindy Hampton Mahoney, CEO
 John Gardner, Vice President, Global Marketing
 Liz Glover, Vice President, Design & Development
 Kurt Kozacek, Vice President, Sales
 Steven Twedell, Vice President, Finance

Company Products & Services 
DecoPac markets products, services, and technologies to bakeries and baking enthusiasts who specialize in cakes, cupcakes, cookies, and more. DecoPac sells cake decorating products and supplies to businesses and consumers. 
 Cake decorating kits
 Cupcake picks
 Cake decorations
 Print-on-Demand cake decorating systems
 Pre-cut fondant shapes
 Pre-rolled fondant sheets
 SugarSoft® edible cake decorations
 Decorated cake merchandising books
 Online cake ordering kiosks
 Food Colors
 Candles

Brands 
DecoPac owns a number of brands that market to businesses and consumers. DecoPac, PhotoCake, and Culpitt sell to bakeries, supplying them with cake toppers, edible images, and licensed cake decorations. Bakery Crafts supplies bakeries primarily, but also sells packaged cake decorating goods to consumers in retail stores and supermarkets.

Consumer Brands 
DecoPac's consumer brands include:
 Cakes.com
 Culpitt Cake Club
 The Craft Company

Corporate Brands 
DecoPac's business-to-business brands include:
 PhotoCake
 DecoPac
 Culpitt
 Sugarfayre
 Bakery Crafts
 ProBest, LLC

References

External links
 Official website

Privately held companies based in Minnesota
Companies established in 1982
Anoka, Minnesota
Manufacturing companies based in Minnesota
1982 establishments in Minnesota